Events from the year 1990 in Jordan.

Incumbents
Monarch: Hussein 
Prime Minister: Mudar Badran

Events

Births
7 May - Ahmed Abu Kabeer.
Hatem Abu Khadra.

Establishments

Jordanian Democratic Popular Unity Party.

See also

 Years in Iraq
 Years in Syria
 Years in Saudi Arabia

References

 
1990s in Jordan
Jordan
Jordan
Years of the 20th century in Jordan